The men's 10 metre platform, also reported as high diving or platform diving, was one of four diving events on the Diving at the 1968 Summer Olympics programme. It was the 14th appearance of the event, which has been held at every Olympic Games since the 1904 Summer Olympics.

Competition format
The competition was split into two phases:

Preliminary round (24–25 October)
Divers performed six compulsory dives with limited degrees of difficulty and one voluntary dives without limits. The twelve divers with the highest scores advanced to the final.
Final (26 October)
Divers performed three voluntary dives without limit of degrees of difficulty. The final ranking was determined by the combined score with the preliminary round.

Schedule
All times are Central Time Zone (UTC-6)

Results

References

Sources
 

Men
1968
Men's events at the 1968 Summer Olympics